California is the most populous state in the United States.

California may also refer to:

Arts and entertainment

Film and television
California (1927 film), an American Western silent film by W.S. Van Dyke
California (1947 film), an American Western by John Farrow
California (1963 film), an American Western by Hamil Petroff
California (1977 film), an Italo-Spanish Spaghetti Western by Michele Lupo
California Carlson, a sidekick of Hopalong Cassidy
Robert California, a character on the American TV sitcom The Office

Music
California, a 1973–1985 pop rock band featuring Les Fradkin

Albums

California (American Music Club album), 1988
California (Blink-182 album) or the title song, 2016
California (The Electric Prunes album), 2004
California (Gianna Nannini album) or the title song, 1979
California (Mr. Bungle album), 1999
California (Wilson Phillips album), 2004
California (Datarock EP) or the title song, 2011
California (Diplo EP), 2018
California, by Riverdogs, 1990

Songs

 "California" (Amelia Lily song), 2014
 "California" (Belinda Carlisle song), 1997
 "California" (Big & Rich song), 2017
 "California" (Delta Spirit song), 2012
 "California" (Joni Mitchell song), 1971
 "California" (Lenny Kravitz song), 2004
 "California" (Mylène Farmer song), 1995
 "California" (Phantom Planet song), 2002
 "California" (Usher song), 2020
 "California" (Wave song), 2001 
 "California", by Bob Dylan from NCIS: The Official TV Soundtrack - Vol. 2, 2009
 "California", by Childish Gambino from "Awaken, My Love!", 2016
 "California", by Chuck Berry from Rockit, 1979
 "California", by CHVRCHES from Screen Violence, 2021
 "California", by Debbie Boone from Midstream, 1978
 "California", by Grimes from Art Angels, 2015
 "California", by Hollywood Undead from Swan Songs, 2008
 "California", by James Blunt from The Afterlove, 2017
 "California", by John Mayall from The Turning Point, 1969
 "California", by Keith Stegall, 1985
 "California", by Lana Del Rey from Norman Fucking Rockwell!, 2019
 "California", by Lorde from Solar Power, 2021
 "California", by Low from The Great Destroyer, 2005
 "California", by Manafest from Stories Since Seventy Nine, 2012
 "California", by Mazzy Star from Seasons of Your Day, 2013
 "California", by Metro Station from Metro Station, 2007
 "California", by Never Shout Never from What Is Love?, 2010
 "California", by Oliver Tree from Cowboy Tears, 2022
 "California", by Rich Brian, Niki, and Warren Hue, 2021
 "California", by Rufus Wainwright from Poses, 2001
 "California", by Semisonic from Feeling Strangely Fine, 1998
 "California", by Silverstein from This Is How the Wind Shifts, 2013
 "California", by Tim McGraw from Damn Country Music, 2015
 "California", by Tom Petty and the Heartbreakers from Songs and Music from "She's the One", 1996
 "California", by twlv, 2020
 "California", by Wax from 13 Unlucky Numbers, 1995
 "California", by the Wedding Present from Hit Parade 1, 1992
 "California", by Wild Strawberries from Bet You Think I'm Lonely, 1994
 "California", by Winds of Plague from Against the World, 2011
 "California", by Withered Hand from New Gods, 2014
 "California (The Way I Say I Love You)", by Good Charlotte from Generation Rx, 2018
 "California (There Is No End to Love)", by U2 from Songs of Innocence, 2014

Other arts and entertainment
California, a fictitious island in the novel Las sergas de Esplandián
California (novel), by Edan Lepucki
California (sculpture), a marble sculpture by Hiram Powers
 California Class starship from “ Star Trek Lower Decks”

Naval vessels
USS California, a list of U.S. Navy ships
California-class cruiser, a class of two U.S. Navy guided missile cruisers
ARM California, a list of Mexican Navy ships

People
Randy California (1951–1997), American musician, band member of Spirit
California Molefe (born 1980), Botswana runner

Places

Regions and historical territories
California Republic, a short-lived state declared during the Mexican–American War
The Californias or Las Californias, a region along the west coast of North America during Spanish and Mexican rule
Province of Las Californias, a province of New Spain, encompassing the region and further areas
California (department), a department of the Second Mexican Empire (1863−1865)
California (titular see), a titular see of the Catholic Church
Island of California, an early geographical misconception that the Baja California Peninsula was an island

Municipalities and neighborhoods

United Kingdom
California, Bedfordshire, a hamlet
California, Berkshire, a village
California, Birmingham, a suburban area of Birmingham
California, Buckinghamshire, a hamlet
California, Derby, an inner-city area of Derby
California, Falkirk, a village
California, Ipswich, Suffolk
California, Norfolk, a seaside resort

United States
California City, California
California, Kentucky, a city
California, Louisville, Kentucky, a neighborhood
California, Maine, an unincorporated community
California, Maryland, a census-designated place and community
California Township, Michigan
California, Missouri, a city
Califon, New Jersey, originally named California, a borough
California, Ohio (disambiguation), several places
California, Pennsylvania, a borough
California, West Virginia, a ghost town

Other municipalities and neighborhoods
Califórnia, Paraná, Brazil
California, Ontario, Canada
California, Santander, Colombia
California, Usulután, El Salvador
La California, Tuscany, Italy
California, Ubay, Bohol, Philippines
California, Trinidad and Tobago

Outer space
California Nebula
341 California, an asteroid

Other places
California peninsula, also called the peninsula of Baja California
Gulf of California, a body of water between the Baja California peninsula and the Mexican mainland

Education
University of California, a public university system
California Golden Bears, the athletic programs of the University of California, Berkeley
 California University of Science and Medicine, Colton, California
California University of Pennsylvania, California, Pennsylvania
California Vulcans, the athletic programs of California University of Pennsylvania
 California High School (San Ramon, California)
 California High School (Whittier, California)
 California Elementary School, Orange Unified School District, Orange, California

Transportation

Land vehicles
Ferrari California, a convertible
Moto Guzzi California, a motorcycle 
Volkswagen California, a passenger van
Chevrolet Corvette 305 "California," the version of the 1980 Chevrolet Corvette sold in California
Chrysler California Cruiser, a concept car

Ships
SS California, a list of ships
California, a small sailing ship used during the Northwest Passage expedition of 1746

Chicago Transit Authority stations
California (CTA Blue Line station)
California (CTA Congress Line station), an abandoned station on the Congress Line (now part of the Blue Line)
California (CTA Green Line station)
California (CTA Pink Line station)

Other stations
 La California station, a station of Caracas metro

Other uses
Hotel California (disambiguation)
California (magazine), a magazine published by the Cal Alumni Association
California macrophylla, a plant species in the family Geraniaceae

See also
Alta California (disambiguation)
Baja California (disambiguation)
California Star (disambiguation)
Californian (disambiguation)
Californië (disambiguation)
Californio
Californium
Kalifornia (disambiguation)